Educated Fish is a 1937 animated short film that was part of Paramount's Color Classics series. It was nominated for Best Animated Short at the 10th Academy Awards.

Plot
In an underwater school for fish, the bad boy, Tommy Cod, would rather play pinball in his desk than recite the daily lesson about hooks, fishing poles, and lines so strong. Tommy is locked out of class by the teacher to study harder. He learns this lesson the hard way when being caught by a fisherman's bait.

Preservation
Educated Fish was preserved by the Academy Film Archive, in conjunction with the UCLA Film and Television Archive, in 2013.

References

External links 
 
 

1937 films
Fleischer Studios short films
Paramount Pictures short films
1937 animated films
1930s animated short films
Color Classics cartoons
1930s American animated films
Short films directed by Dave Fleischer